Tune-o-matic (also abbreviated to TOM) is the name of a fixed or floating bridge design for electric guitars.  It was designed by Ted McCarty (Gibson Guitar Corporation president) and introduced on the Gibson Super 400 guitar in 1953 and the Les Paul Custom the following year.  In 1955, it was used on the Gibson Les Paul Gold Top. It was gradually accepted as a standard on almost all Gibson electric guitars, replacing the previous wrap-around bridge design, except on the budget series.

Function 
Guitar strings, especially steel strings, are not ideal vibrators. Generally the thicker the string, the shorter the effective length. This refers to the length of string involved in producing a sound, as opposed to the length between the nut and the bridge. Many guitar designs with fixed bridges have the bridge slanted or stepped so that the distance from nut to bridge is larger for thick strings. The Tune-o-matic extends this idea to make the distance adjustable for all the strings, within limits.

Construction 

Both the ABR-1 and Nashville Tune-o-Matic bridges consist of one oblong saddle which holds 6 saddle inserts and their corresponding string length (intonation) adjustment screws. Later ABR-1 bridges also have a saddle retainer wire that holds all the saddle inserts and screws in place. Both are mounted to guitars via two threaded posts that may be screwed directly into the guitar's solid body (old style), or into threaded anchors that are pressed into the body. These bridges are also used on some archtop hollowbody guitars, such as the Gibson ES175D, which use a floating rosewood or ebony base (or foot) with two threaded posts screwed directly into it.

To adjust the string height (action), the Tune O Matic bridge sits atop two threaded wheels screwed on to its threaded posts. Some have integrated wheel posts that thread into anchors, but they are less common. Non-Gibson models often incorporate screw heads on the bridge posts.

Each saddle insert has a small groove that matches string gauge and shape to keep the string from slipping off the saddle insert. When fully assembled, each string sits astride a saddle insert and thus "marks" the end of the sting's vibrating length- from the string nut to the saddle insert.

After passing over the saddle insert, each string makes a slight downward angle toward the stopbar tailpiece, vibrato, or on hollowbody guitars a trapeze tailpiece. Some solid body guitars have  "strings through the body" construction. Whichever way the strings are held, the fact that the string makes a downward angle after the saddle creates "break angle". Break angle keeps the string from popping out of the saddle insert's groove because the angle causes the string to sit tightly over the saddle. Break angle also contributes to the guitar's sustain and on an acoustic guitar, its volume. There is also break angle created over the nut caused by the headstock pitching back.

The Tune-o-matic bridge is not absolutely flat, and standard Gibson Tune-o-matic bridges have a 12" radius. Ideally, the radius should match the radius of fretboard for the most comfortable playing experience.

Due to its symmetrical design, it's possible to accidentally fit the bridge on backwards on the two posts. This can lead to a certain amount of confusion if the bridge is ever removed for any reason. Conventionally, the string length (intonation) adjustment screw heads of the ABR-1 bridge face the neck, and the screw heads of the newer "Nashville" bridge face the stopbar. Unless the player wishes to completely reset the action and intonation, it is important to refit the bridge in the same orientation as before a string change, regardless of which way round it was to start with.

Varieties 

Since its invention, different versions by Gibson and other companies have emerged:

• ABR-1 without retainer wire: 1954-1962

• ABR-1 with retainer wire: 1962-1975

• Schaller Wide travel Tune-o-Matic a.k.a. "Harmonica bridge": 1970-1980 (Gibson SG/ Kalamazoo plant)

• Modern TOM a.k.a. "Nashville" bridge: 1975-    (First introduced when Gibson moved the Les Paul production from Kalamazoo to the new Nashville plant). It is still a signature feature found on guitars from the Gibson USA product line.

There are multiple widely known Tune-o-matic models that differ in the following parameters:

Adjust-o-Matic 

Gibson competitor Gretsch has their own copy of the Tune-o-matic, called the Adjust-o-matic. Although originally introduced on Gretsch guitars in the 1970s, the Adjust-o-matic is common on modern Fender guitars, since Fender acquired Gretsch in the early 2000s. There is no definitive specification of an Adjust-o-matic Bridge, ranging from exact copies of the Tune-o-matic to more curved and narrower versions to fit the traditional 9.5" Fender neck radius. Often the term Adjust-o-matic is used to describe any Tune-o-matic on a FMIC brand guitar such as Jackson, Charvel or Squier. The style of bridge is sometimes referred to as an "F-style" or "F-spaced" Tune-o-matic by Fender competitors to avoid making overt references to the Fender trademarked term.

Saddle groove maintenance 

Over time, particularly on the thinner unwound E, B and G strings, the groove may cut into the saddle in which the string rests, taking on a sharper 'V' shape due to the action of the string sliding slightly in the groove, particularly during string bending. As this 'V' shape sharpens, it takes on a slight scissor characteristic and gradually any new string is abraded as string tension pulls it deeper into the groove; this leads to increased breakage, particularly during bending - exactly at the saddle. The simplest solution is a slight filing out of the groove, to recreate more of a 'U' shape, while saddle replacement, particularly with very high quality metal alloy replacements, is another option.

Spelling 

There is no general consensus on "proper" capitalization of bridge name. Gibson's official site usually spells it as "Tune-o-matic", while "Tune-o-Matic" and "Tune-O-Matic" are frequently used in advertising and promotional material.

References 

Guitar bridges